Pachyodes pratti is a moth of the family Geometridae first described by Louis Beethoven Prout in 1927. It is found on Peninsular Malaysia, Sumatra and Borneo. The habitat consists of hill dipterocarp forests and lower montane forests.

References

Pseudoterpnini
Moths described in 1927
Taxa named by Louis Beethoven Prout
Moths of Asia